King of the Avenue is a 2010 American-Canadian fantasy thriller drama film written and directed by Ryan Combs and starring Ving Rhames, Simon Rex and Esai Morales.

Cast
Simon Rex as Taz
Ving Rhames as Norman Combs/De'Sha
Esai Morales as Natas
Erick Nathan as Cal
Elizabeth Di Prinzio as Amanda
Hemky Madera as Hector
Eddie B. Smith as Scooter Pie
Gillie Da Kid as Stanley

Production
Filming occurred in Puerto Rico.

References

External links
 
 

American thriller drama films
American fantasy drama films
Canadian fantasy films
Canadian thriller films
English-language Canadian films
Films shot in Puerto Rico
2010s English-language films
2010s American films
2010s Canadian films